Boningale is a civil parish in Shropshire, England.  It contains 21 listed buildings that are recorded in the National Heritage List for England.  More properties are 'curtilage listed' by virtue of their location on the grade II listed park and garden of Patshull. Of the formally listed properties, two are listed at Grade II*, the middle of the three grades, and the others are at Grade II, the lowest grade.  The parish contains the village of Boningale, and is otherwise rural.  The listed buildings include two former manor houses, other houses and associated structures, farmhouses and farm buildings, many of which date back to the 15th–17th centuries and which are basically timber framed.  The other listed buildings include a church and items in the churchyard, and a telephone kiosk.


Key

Buildings

References

Citations

Sources

Lists of buildings and structures in Shropshire